The Newnes Baronetcy, of Wildcroft in the Parish of Putney in the County of London; of Hollerday Hill in the Parish of Lynton, and of Hesketh House in the Borough of Torquay, both in the County of Devon, was a title in the Baronetage of the United Kingdom. It was created on 15 February 1895 for the publisher, editor and politician George Newnes. He was succeeded by his son, the second Baronet. He sat as member of parliament for Bassetlaw. The title became extinct on his death in 1955.

Newnes baronets, of Wildcroft, Hollerday Hill and Hesketh House (1895)
Sir George Newnes, 1st Baronet (1851–1910)
Sir Frank Hillyard Newnes, 2nd Baronet (1876–1955)

References

Extinct baronetcies in the Baronetage of the United Kingdom